Machaerophorus is a genus of flowering plants belonging to the family Brassicaceae.

Its native range is Peru.

Species
Species:

Machaerophorus arequipa 
Machaerophorus laticarpus 
Machaerophorus matthioloides

References

Brassicaceae
Brassicaceae genera